Nozières may refer to the following places in France:

 Nozières, Ardèche, a commune in the department of Ardèche
 Nozières, Cher, a commune in the department of Cher